Events from the year 1988 in Ireland.

Incumbents
 President: Patrick Hillery
 Taoiseach: Charles Haughey (FF)
 Tánaiste: Brian Lenihan (FF)
 Minister for Finance:
 Ray MacSharry (FF) (until 24 November 1988)
 Albert Reynolds (FF) (from 24 November 1988)
 Chief Justice: Thomas Finlay
 Dáil: 25th 
 Seanad: 18th

Events
 1 January – Dublin City celebrated its millennium.
 11 January – The Social Democratic and Labour Party leader, John Hume, and Gerry Adams of Sinn Féin held a surprise meeting in Belfast.
 27 January – The Irish internet country code top-level domain .ie was registered.
 29 February – The first edition of the Irish Daily Star newspaper went on sale.
 6 March – Operation Flavius: a Special Air Service (SAS) team of the British Army shot dead an unarmed Provisional Irish Republican Army (IRA) Active Service Unit (Danny McCann, Seán Savage, and Mairéad Farrell) in Gibraltar.
 16 March – Milltown Cemetery attack: Three men were killed and 70 were wounded in a gun and grenade attack by the Loyalist paramilitary, Michael Stone, on mourners at Milltown Cemetery in Belfast during the funerals of the three IRA members who were killed in Gibraltar.
 19 March
 Corporals killings in Belfast: Two British Army corporals were abducted, beaten, and shot dead by Irish republicans after driving into the funeral cortège of IRA members killed in the Milltown Cemetery attack.
 Five thousand people gathered for an anti-apartheid rally at the General Post Office in Dublin.
 22 March – Tributes were paid to Aran Islands-born poet Máirtín Ó Direáin at his funeral in Dublin.
 16 April – The National Lottery launched its national live draw.
 15 June – The IRA killed six British soldiers in a bomb attack in Lisburn.
 19 June – The Royal Canal in Dublin officially reopened for leisure purpose between Leixlip and Maynooth.
 10 July – Dublin celebrated its official 1,000th birthday.
 18 July – The South African anti-apartheid leader Nelson Mandela was awarded the freedom of the City of Dublin.
 11 August – The Department of Health launched an information booklet as the number of AIDS cases increased dramatically.
 28 August – Leopardstown Racecourse celebrated its 100th anniversary.
 12 September – Archbishop Thomas Morris resigned as Archbishop of Cashel and was replaced by Dermot Clifford.
 8 October – A tax amnesty produced the surrender of over £500 million in taxpayer payments.
 17 October – The Independent Radio and Television Commission was established to regulate non-RTÉ radio and television services.
 26 October – The legal case of Norris v. Ireland was decided by the European Court of Human Rights, ruling that the existence of laws in Ireland criminalising consensual gay sex was illegal.
 16 November – Minister for Finance Ray MacSharry was appointed Ireland's new European Community Commissioner.
 31 December – Pirate Radio closed down.
 Undated
 The National Archives of Ireland was formed under terms of the National Archives Act 1986 to take over the functions of the State Paper Office and the Public Record Office of Ireland.
 Gambling company Paddy Power was established by the merger of the 40 shops of three Irish bookmakers: Stewart Kenny, David Power, and John Corcoran.
 The Gay and Lesbian Equality Network was established in Dublin.
 The free gay magazine Gay Community News was published for the first time.

Arts and literature
 30 April – Ireland hosted the Eurovision Song Contest.
 13 June – A statue of Molly Malone by Jeanne Rynhart was unveiled in Grafton Street, Dublin, to mark the city's millennium. The installations Anna Livia in O'Connell Street by Éamonn O'Doherty (agreed 7 March) and People's Island by Rachel Joynt were produced for the same commemoration.
 September – The television channel RTÉ 2 was relaunched as Network 2.
 3 October – Australian television soap opera Home and Away was launched on Network 2 several months after airing in its country of origin. 
 11 October – Comedy series Nighthawks was first broadcast on Network 2.
 Toasted Heretic released their debut album Songs for Swinging Celibates.

Sport

Association football
 Ireland played in the European Championship finals for the first time.
 12 June – Ireland celebrated a win over England 1–0 at the 1988 European Football Championship.

Cycling
 13 March – Sean Kelly won the Paris–Nice cycle race for the seventh year in a row.
 15 May – Sean Kelly won the Vuelta a España cycle race.

Gaelic football
 Meath GAA beat Cork GAA 0–13 to 0–9 in Croke Park to win a second consecutive All-Ireland Senior Football Championship title.

Golf
 The Carroll's Irish Open tournament was won by Ian Woosnam (Wales).
 16 October – Ireland (Eamonn Darcy, Ronan Rafferty, Des Smyth) won the Dunhill Cup at St. Andrew's golf course in Scotland.

Hurling
Galway GAA beat Tipperary GAA 1–15 to 0–14 in Croke Park to win a second consecutive All-Ireland Senior Hurling Championship title.

Births

7 January – Robert Sheehan, actor.
15 January – Padraig Amond, soccer player.
23 January – Alan Power, soccer player.
29 January – Owen Garvan, soccer player.
21 February – Darren Forsyth, soccer player.
22 February – Robert Bayly, soccer player.
21 March – Kevin Guthrie, actor.
2 May – Stephen Henderson, soccer player.
21 May – Adam Rooney, soccer player.
 25 June – Grace O'Malley, Pirate, head of the Ó Máille dynasty.
14 July – Conor McGregor, mixed martial artist.
25 July – Anthony Stokes, soccer player.
26 July – Grainne Leahy, pharmacist.
14 September – Shane Tracy, soccer player.
22 September – Keith Quinn, soccer player.
11 October – Joe Canning, hurler (Portumna, Galway, Connacht).
28 October – Devon Murray, actor

Deaths

January to June
1 January – Sister Philippa Brazill, nurse in Australia (born 1896).
1 January – Dan Spring, Gaelic footballer, trade unionist and Labour Party TD (born 1910).
15 January – Seán MacBride, former Clann na Poblachta TD, Cabinet Minister, Nobel Peace Prize winner (born 1904).
2 February – Frederick Blaney, cricketer (born 1918).
1 March – Tommy Breen, international soccer player (born 1912).
19 March – Máirtín Ó Direáin, poet (born 1910).
2 April – E. Chambré Hardman, photographer (born 1898).
10 May – Ciarán Bourke, musician, an original member of The Dubliners (born 1936).
5 June – Robert Dudley Edwards, historian (born 1909).
11 June – Nick O'Donnell, Kilkenny and Wexford hurler (born 1925).

July to December
17 July – Frank Carter, Fianna Fáil TD, Seanad member (born 1910).
17 September – Mick Cashman, Cork hurler (born 1931).
10 October – Sonny Hool, cricketer (born 1924).
27 October – Frank Devlin, badminton player (born 1900).
November – Terry Leahy, Kilkenny hurler (born 1918).
7 December – Peter Langan, restaurateur (born 1941).
8 December – John Joe McGirl, chief of staff of the Irish Republican Army (born 1921).
21 December – Eithne Dunne, actress (born 1919).
22 December – Jack Bowden, cricketer and hockey player (born 1916).

Full date unknown
Tommy Potts, fiddle player (born 1912).
Ed Reavy, fiddle player and songwriter (born 1897).

See also
1988 in Irish television

References

 
1980s in Ireland
Years of the 20th century in Ireland
Ireland